Hans Åke Krister "Hasse" Mattisson (born 29 August 1972) is a Swedish former football player and current head coach.

Club career 
Mattisson came to Malmö FF from Husie IF in 1995 and remained in the club for a decade, and was the team captain during the Superettan season of 2000. In August 2006, he left Malmö FF for Halmstad BK; the move came as a shock for MFF supporters, who held Mattisson in very high regard. Nevertheless, Mattisson received enormous applause from the supporters who had travelled to Halmstad to watch him play against Malmö the following month, both before and after the game. At the end of the 2007 season, Mattisson announced that he would retire from professional football and had signed a new deal with MFF, working for their marketing department.

International career 
Mattisson appeared once for the Sweden B team.

Managerial career 
Following a co-operation deal with Malmö FF and former rivals IFK Malmö, the club announced that Mattisson would join IFK Malmö as assistant player-manager alongside MFF teammate Jörgen Ohlsson - the co-operation was broken in 2009, with Mattisson and Ohlsson being relieved of their coaching duties. Mattisson later played half a season for his youth club Husie IF in the fall of 2009. He worked last as the head coach of FC Rosengård 1917, until July 2015.

Honours

Malmö FF
Allsvenskan: 2004

References

External links
Mattisson's blog  

1972 births
Living people
Swedish footballers
Allsvenskan players
Superettan players
Malmö FF players
Halmstads BK players
Swedish bloggers
Association football midfielders
FC Rosengård 1917 managers
Swedish football managers